The Pudu River is a major river in Yunnan Province in southwest China.

The source of Pudu River is located in Songming County; the headwater stream is called Muyang River. The river runs southwards through Kunming and then it is called the Panlong River; it flows into Dian Lake at the south of Kunming.

Geography
The river leaves Dian Lake near Haikou Subdistrict (formerly, Haikou Town) (海口街道) of Xishan District, in the southwestern part of the lake. The outlet of the lake is called Tanglang Creek or Tanglang River. The river runs northward through Anning City and Fumin County; from there on, it is called Pudu River. It joins Jinsha River in the northeastern part of Luquan Yi and Miao Autonomous County. The river is about 363.6 kilometres long.

Name
The name Pudu (普渡) is a slogan from Buddhism Classics, literally "helping people get out of sorrows and troubles". Some people also believe that "Pudu" here actually refers to "a ferry ran by Pu's family".

In Chinese, the name of the Pudu River is written with the same Chinese characters as the Chinese name of Purdue University, but this is just a coincidence.

Notes

Tributaries of the Yangtze River
Rivers of Yunnan
Geography of Kunming